Ajjibal  is a village in the southern state of Karnataka, India. It is located in the Sirsi taluk of Uttara Kannada district in Karnataka.

The village is adjacent to Sirsi- Siddapur state highway 93. 
A co-operative society serving since 1919, presently called as Ajjibal Group Gramagala Seva Sahakari Bank Ltd., has the credit of being one of the best managed society. Ajjibal has an oil mill, a blacksmith workshop- aachaari shaale, both of which are much helpful to the farmers around. The village homes famous Shambhulinga temple. Another ancient temple, Prabhu Devasthana is located in Karoor, a nearby village. G.S. Hegde Ajjibal, a  former MLA, journalist and confidant of Ramakrishna Hegde is from this village.

See also
 Sirsi, Karnataka
 Uttara Kannada
 List of districts of Karnataka
 Karwar
 Mangalore

References

External links
 

Villages in Uttara Kannada district